At the Gates of Utopia is the second studio album by the Italian symphonic black metal band Stormlord.

Track listing
 "Under the Samnites' Spears" – 6:50
 "I Am Legend" – 5:07
 "Xanadu (A Vision in a Dream)" – 4:21
 "And Winter Was" – 4:16
 "At the Gates of Utopia" – Instrumental – 2:25
 "The Curse of Medusa" – 6:33
 "The Burning Hope" – 6:21
 "A Sight Inwards" – 4:40
 "The Secrets of the Earth" – 6:18

Personnel
Cristiano Borchi - vocals
Pierangelo Giglioni - Guitar
Francesco Bucci - Bass
Simone Scazzocchio - keyboards
David Folchitto - drums

Guests 
 Volgar dei Xacrestani - opera vocals, narration, clean singing

2001 albums
Stormlord (band) albums
Scarlet Records albums